Neil Pryde (born 19 October 1938) is a Hong Kong sailor. He competed in the Flying Dutchman event at the 1968 Summer Olympics.

References

External links
 

1938 births
Living people
Hong Kong male sailors (sport)
Olympic sailors of Hong Kong
Sailors at the 1968 Summer Olympics – Flying Dutchman
Place of birth missing (living people)